Depressaria hofmanni is a moth of the family Depressariidae. It is found from France and Spain to Poland and Romania and from Germany to Italy and Austria. It has also been recorded from Greece and Russia.

The larvae feed on Seseli libanotis. They live in between the leaves of the host plant, which they spin together with silk.

References

External links
lepiforum.de

Moths described in 1861
Depressaria
Moths of Europe